Grylloprociphilus is a genus of woolly and gall-making aphids in the family Aphididae. There is at least one described species in Grylloprociphilus, G. imbricator.

References

Further reading

External links

 

Eriosomatinae
sternorrhyncha genera
Gall-inducing insects